Flag information symbols are used by vexillologists to indicate certain characteristics of flags, such as where they are used, who uses them, and what they look like. The symbols were created by vexillologist Whitney Smith and then adopted by the International Federation of Vexillological Associations (FIAV) in the early 1970s. Vexillologist Željko Heimer added the symbols for  normal and  historical in the early 1990s.

Vexillological symbols 
Vexillological symbols describe information on a flag's recognition status and design.

Usage Symbols 
The usage symbols are based on a grid of two rows representing use on land and use on water, and three columns representing private use, public use, and military use. Each circle in the grid indicates the flag has one or more of the following six basic usages:

A single design may be associated with no usages or multiple usages. Heimer suggested an additional row for air ensigns, but it has not been adopted by FIAV.

See also 
 Glossary of vexillology

References 

Vexillology